María Teresa Torró Flor was the defending champion, but chose not to participate.

Irina Khromacheva won the title, defeating Maria Sakkari in the final, 1–6, 7–6(7–3), 6–1.

Seeds

Main draw

Finals

Top half

Bottom half

References 
 Main draw

Open Engie Saint-Gaudens Midi-Pyrenees - Singles